Dennis Ozment (born May 2, 1945) is an American politician who served in the Minnesota House of Representatives from 1985 to 2009.

References

1945 births
Living people
People from Farmington, Minnesota
Republican Party members of the Minnesota House of Representatives